M. nanus may refer to:
 Merycopotamus nanus, an extinct anthracothere mammal species found in Asia
 Mesocapromys nanus, the dwarf hutia, a rodent species found only in Cuba
 Mimulus nanus, the dwarf purple monkeyflower, a plant species native to the western United States

See also
 Nanus (disambiguation)